Enzo Josué Moyano (born February 15, 1989 in San Luis, Argentina) is an Argentine former professional cyclist, who rode professionally between 2012 and 2019 for the ,  and  teams. He now works as a directeur sportif for UCI Continental team .

Major results
2011
1st Stage 5 Vuelta a Navarra
3rd Tour de San Luis
3rd Vuelta Ciclista a León
2014
5th Tour de San Luis
2017
1st Stage 4 Vuelta del Uruguay

References

External links

1989 births
Living people
Argentine male cyclists
People from San Luis, Argentina